The 2003 NAIA football season was the component of the 2003 college football season organized by the National Association of Intercollegiate Athletics (NAIA) in the United States. The season's playoffs, known as the NAIA Football National Championship, culminated with the championship game on December 20, at Jim Carroll Stadium in Savannah, Tennessee.

Conference standings

Postseason

Rankings

References